Walking Back into the Past (German: Weg in die Vergangenheit) is a 1954 Austrian drama film directed by Karl Hartl and starring Paula Wessely, Attila Hörbiger and Josef Meinrad.

It was shot at the Thalerhof Studios in Graz and on location in Vienna. The film's sets were designed by the art director Werner Schlichting.

Cast
 Paula Wessely as Gabriele Gärtner
 Attila Hörbiger as Berthold Gärtner
 Josef Meinrad as Franz Nägele
 Willi Forst as Clemens Monti
 Willy Fritsch as Werner Schrey
 Rudolf Fernau as Stefan Berg
 Maria Holst as Adrienne Monti
 Karl Ehmann as Pokorny
 Rose Renée Roth as Olga
 Heribert Meisel as Reporter

References

Bibliography 
 Fritsche, Maria. Homemade Men in Postwar Austrian Cinema: Nationhood, Genre and Masculinity. Berghahn Books, 2013.

External links 
 

1954 films
1954 drama films
Austrian drama films
1950s German-language films
Films directed by Karl Hartl
Sascha-Film films
Films shot in Vienna
Films set in Vienna
Austrian films based on plays
Austrian black-and-white films